Salai Srisathorn (born 17 November 1933) is a Thai former sports shooter. He competed in the 50 metre rifle, three positions event at the 1964 Summer Olympics. He also competed at the 1966 Asian Games.

References

1933 births
Salai Srisathorn
Salai Srisathorn
Asian Games medalists in shooting
Living people
Medalists at the 1966 Asian Games
Salai Srisathorn
Place of birth missing (living people)
Shooters at the 1964 Summer Olympics
Shooters at the 1966 Asian Games
Salai Srisathorn